Amanda Portales Sotelo (born Lima, July 7, 1961) is a Peruvian singer, author, composer, and performer of Peruvian folklore, with more than 50 years of artistic experience of the Peruvian Andean culture.

Biography 
Her mother is Irene del Centro, known as the Dama Elegante of Folklore. She is an author and composer from Yauyos. Her father, Lucio Portales was from Huánuco and was a violinist and orchestra director. All her siblings are performers. Amanda Portales says she was almost born onstage. This is because her mother, director of the folklore company Juan Huquequeña, had to replace an absent dancer when her pregnancy was well advanced. While she was acting onstage, labor started.

Career 
Throughout her more than 50 years of career, Amanda Portales has acquired several different names, for example: Cápac Tika singing from Cusco, Flor Collavina singing music from Puno, Flor Amanda, Amanda del Mantaro or Amanda de los Andes singing the folklore of the Center of Peru. Finally, Amanda Portales, which is her artistic name. "La Novia del Perú", was a nickname created by Antonio Muñoz Monge in 1984.

In 2006 she was recognized by the Peruvian government with the Order of Merit for Distinguished Services in the Degree of Commander for being a recognized interpreter of Peruvian folklore and culture.

Portales has visited Korea, Greece, Hungary, Russia, Spain, Sweden, France, Italy, Belgium, Bolivia, Brazil, Chile, Venezuela, Argentina, the United States, Costa Rica, and Canada.

Records

IEMPSA record label 

 1988 "Rosa Hermosa" (Long Play)
 1989 "Digan lo que digan" (Long Play)
 1990 "Bodas de Plata" (Long Play)
 1992 "La Novia del Perú" (CD)
 1994 "Viva la Vida" (CD)
 1995 "Bodas de Perla" (CD)
 1996 "Siempre Primera" (CD)

Mundo Music record label 

 2000 "El Quinto de Oro" Vol. I (CD)
 2000 "El Quinto de Oro" Vol. II (CD)

Mundo Producciones Record Label 

 2005 "Bodas de Rubí" Vol. I (CD)
 2005 "Bodas de Rubí" Vol. II (CD)
 2007 "Sietes lindas canciones" (CD)

Fiesta Andina Producciones Record Label 

 2010 "Bodas de Zafiro" Vol. I (CD)
 2010 "Bodas de Zafiro" Vol. II (CD)
 2012 "Tradición Wanka" Vol. I y II (CD)
 2014 "Primero lo Nuestro" (CD)
 2015 "Amanda Amando" (CD)

Films 

 2006 Noche de Ensueño
 2007 La Novia del Perú
 2010 Bodas de Zafiro
 2016 Bodas de Oro

Further reading 

 
 Escuchar música de Amanda Portales
 Música de Amanda Portales

References 

 Entrevista Diario La Primera
 Entrevista Perú 21
 Condecoración por el estado peruano
 Artículo sobre Amanda Portales

21st-century Peruvian women singers
21st-century Peruvian singers
Singers from Lima
1961 births
Living people
20th-century Peruvian women singers
20th-century Peruvian singers
Peruvian women television presenters